Os Faroleiros is a 1920 Brazilian silent drama film directed by Antônio Leite and Miguel Milano. The film is based on the short story "Os Faroleiros" ("The Lighthouse Keepers") from the book Urupês by Monteiro Lobato.

The film was premiered on 11 March 1920 in Rio de Janeiro.

External links
 

1920 films
Brazilian black-and-white films
Brazilian silent films
1920 crime drama films
Brazilian crime drama films
Silent drama films